A crypt is a stone chamber.

Crypt may refer also to:

Arts, entertainment and media
 Crypt Records, a record label
 Crypts, a fictional alien race in The Man from Nowhere, a Dan Dare story
 The Crypt (film), a 2009 horror film
 The Crypt, a blog hosted by Politico

Amusement park attractions
 The Crypt (Kings Dominion), a HUSS Floorless Top Spin at Kings Dominion amusement park, formerly named Tomb Raider: Firefall
 The Crypt (Kings Island), a HUSS Giant Top Spin formerly located at Kings Island amusement park, originally named Tomb Raider: The Ride

Science and technology

Botany
 Cryptocoryne, a genus of plants colloquially named Crypt
 Cryptopus (plant), an orchid genus abbreviated Crypt

Computing
 Crypt (C), a standard library function in C
 Crypt (Unix), a cryptographic utility program in Unix

Medicine
 Crypt (anatomy), a type of anatomical structure
 Cryptorchidism, the absence of one or both testes from the scrotum
 Crypts of Lieberkühn, anatomical crypts that occur in the intestinal tract

Other uses
 The Crypt School a Grammar School in Gloucester, England

See also
 CRIPT, a gene
 Crypto (disambiguation)
 Cryptography, the study of techniques for secure communication